Jean Parfait Laurent Mafilaza (born July 12, 1947 in Nosy-Be) is a Malagasy politician.  He is a member of the Senate of Madagascar for Diana Region, and is a member of the party.

References

1947 births
Living people
Members of the Senate (Madagascar)